William, Willie, or Bill McCall may refer to:
William McCall (actor) (1870–1938), American film actor
William McCall (politician) (1908–1968), Australian politician
William Frank McCall Jr. (1916–1991), architect
Willie McCall (footballer, born 1898) (1898–1966), Scottish footballer
Willie McCall (footballer, born 1920) (1920–1985), Scottish footballer
Bill McCall (baseball), American Negro league baseball player
Bill McCall (trade unionist) (1929–2021), Scottish trade union leader